The Phycological Society of India was founded and registered as Society on 1962. Prof. M. O. P. Iyengar was the first President of the society. Prof. Vidyavati, former Vice-Chancellor, Kakatiya University, Telangana, India is the President now.

The Phycological Society of India  promotes interest and studies in various branches of phycology.

Publications

The Society also publishes a half yearly research journal called Phykos and the first volume was published in April 1962.

References

External links
http://www.phykosindia.com
http://www.psaalgae.org

Botanical societies
Professional associations based in India
Organizations established in 1962
Natural Science Collections Alliance members
Phycology
Scientific organisations based in India
Scientific societies based in India
1962 establishments in India